Ellams is a surname. Notable people with the surname include:

Inua Ellams (born 1984), British poet, playwright and performer 
Lloyd Ellams (born 1991), British footballer